Skogsby is a locality situated in Mörbylånga Municipality, Kalmar County, Sweden with 569 inhabitants in 2010.

References

External links 

Populated places in Kalmar County
Populated places in Mörbylånga Municipality